The 1947–48 season was Manchester United's 46th season in the Football League and third back in the First Division since their promotion from the Second Division in 1938. They finished the season second in the league but most significantly won the FA Cup with a 4–2 win over Blackpool in their first appearance at Wembley Stadium, ending the club's 37-year wait for a major trophy.

Pre-season and friendlies

First Division

FA Cup

Squad statistics

References

Manchester United F.C. seasons
Manchester United